"Comin' to Your City" is a song written and recorded by American country music duo Big & Rich.  It was released in September 2005 as the lead single and title track from the album of the same name.  The song reached number 21 on the U.S. Billboard Hot Country Singles & Tracks chart and number 72 on the Billboard Hot 100.

It is the current theme song for The Sean Hannity Show.

A version of "Comin' to Your City" is used as the theme song for ESPN's College GameDay, but the ESPN version has references to several college football teams in the lyrics which do not appear in the original song.

Music video
The music video was directed by Jeff Richter and premiered the week of September 12, 2005.

Chart positions
"Comin' to Your City" debuted at number 52 on the U.S Billboard Hot Country Songs chart for the week of September 10, 2005.

References

2005 singles
Big & Rich songs
Music videos directed by Jeff Richter
Song recordings produced by John Rich
Song recordings produced by Paul Worley
Songs written by Big Kenny
Songs written by John Rich
Warner Records Nashville singles
2005 songs